Stefan Slivkov (1837-1917), was a notable 19th-century Bulgarian leader, revolutionary and politician, associate of national hero Vasil Levski, and one of the founders of the local revolutionary committee in Stara Zagora. Slivkov fought for the liberation of Bulgaria from the Ottoman Empire. Captured and exiled in the notorious Diyarbakır in 1873, Slivkov survived torture and humiliation, and was eventually released in 1878, following the Treaty of San Stefano.

Slivkov returned home to become a dedicated builder of the newly freed Eastern Rumelia. He was one of the key figures of the Bulgarian unification. Subsequently, he was elected mayor of Stara Zagora (March 1885 - March 1886), Deputy Mayor, member of the County Council for many years, and ultimately became a Bulgarian National Assemblyman representing the People's Party of Bulgaria. 

Slivkov is remembered with great affection in Stara Zagora. Grateful citizens erected multiple statues and monuments; schools and streets are also named in his honor.

1837 births
1917 deaths
Politicians from Stara Zagora
Bulgarian revolutionaries
19th-century Bulgarian people